The Ginetta GT5 Challenge, currently known as the Protyre Motorsport Ginetta GT5 Challenge for sponsorship reasons (It has also been previously known as the Ginetta 20 Challenge) is a one-make racing series based in the United Kingdom. The series uses the Ginetta G40 and Ginetta G20 race cars and thus has a two class system. The cars use a sealed Ford Zetec 1.8-litre engine and tubular steel chassis, full integral FIA approved roll cage and fibre- glass shell which ensures safe, controlled racing.

Supporting the British Formula Three Championship and British GT Championship the series offers a low-cost opportunity to race in a single-make racing championship, with exposure to top racing teams and is an avenue into top level racing. Highlights from every round will usually be shown on Motors TV.

Racing car
The championship caters for both the Ginetta G40 and Ginetta G20 race cars, both of which run in the same race.

Championships

2012 Championship
The 2012 Total Quartz Ginetta GT5 Challenge rounds take place on the UK’s high-profile circuits, which include Brands Hatch Grand Prix, Donington Park, Oulton Park, Snetterton Motor Racing Circuit, Rockingham Motor Speedway, Silverstone Circuit and Cadwell Park. All weekends are triple headers, thus providing 21 races throughout the season, with all races counting towards the final championship positions. The winner of the 2012 Total Quartz Ginetta GT5 Challenge will receive the use of a Ginetta G50 for the 2013 Ginetta GT Supercup, whilst second overall in the Championship can look forwards to free entry into the 2013 Ginetta GT5 Challenge with the third-placed finisher being awarded half price entry into the 2013  Ginetta GT5 Challenge.

Champions

See also
 Ginetta Cars
 Ginetta Junior
 Ginetta GT Supercup

References

External links
The Protyre Motorsport Ginetta GT5 Challenge Championship at Ginetta Cars

Auto racing series in the United Kingdom
One-make series
Sports car racing series
Challenge